Reactron is a fictional supervillain who appears in comic books published by DC Comics, usually as an adversary of Supergirl.

Publication history
Reactron first appears in The Daring New Adventures of Supergirl #8 (June 1983), in a story written by Paul Kupperberg and drawn by Carmine Infantino.

Fictional character biography

Pre-Crisis

Ben Krullen was a sergeant serving in the US Army during the Vietnam War, alongside Joshua Clay, the future Doom Patrol member who would be known as Tempest. When Krullen massacred the inhabitants of a Vietnamese village, the shock triggered the activation of Clay's metahuman powers. Clay seemingly destroyed Krullen with his energy blasts, then went AWOL.

Krullen, instead of being killed, is transformed into a being capable of generating radioactive energy and concussive blasts. Calling himself Reactron, the Living Reactor, he surfaces years later and attacks the Doom Patrol, then later fights Supergirl.

Post-Crisis
Reactron's origin and background were changed for his appearances after the 1985 Crisis on Infinite Earths storylines. Now known as Benjamin Martin Krull, he faces the Doom Patrol and Power Girl in his first appearance. Most of his pre-Crisis continuity seems intact, but it is now said that his previous battles involved Power Girl instead of Supergirl.

Seemingly destroyed after overloading on Negative Woman's energy, he resurfaces unharmed and as a member of the Suicide Squad. Reactron is once again seemingly destroyed when Deadshot shoots holes in his containment suit, causing him to go critical.

Reactron, Mister Nitro, Geiger, Nuclear, Professor Radium, and Neutron formed the Nuclear Legion in the 2006 miniseries The Battle for Blüdhaven, working for the Society, and came into conflict with Freedom's Ring, which apparently kills Reactron.

Reactron reappears during the "Superman: New Krypton" storyline with a new costume and a new ability. Recruited by General Sam Lane as part of his Project 7734, Reactron is equipped with a heart made of gold kryptonite and partnered with Metallo (who has a heart of green kryptonite). Reactron and Metallo attack the city of New Krypton, where Reactron kills Zor-El, the father of Supergirl. As part of his participation in Project 7734, Lex Luthor sends a robot double of himself with Brainiac on a mission to attack New Krypton, a new planet in Earth's solar system populated by the survivors of the Kryptonian city of Kandor. While there, the Luthor robot tampers with the body chemistry of the previously-captured Reactron. Shortly thereafter, Reactron kills himself, initiating a chain reaction which ultimately destroys New Krypton and all but a handful of its 100,000 inhabitants. Supergirl's mother Alura (who had assumed leadership of the planet) is among the casualties.

During the 2009–2010 "Blackest Night" storyline, Scarecrow drugs Supergirl with his fear toxin, which causes her to believe she is fighting Reactron, reanimated as a Black Lantern.

Powers and abilities
In both Pre-and Post-Crisis continuities, Reactron has the ability to generate radiation from his body. He can focus this into concussive blasts. Reactron is also equipped with a heart made of a gold Kryptonite variant, which allows him to render a Kryptonian powerless for 15 seconds.

In other media
Reactron appears in the 2015 television series Supergirl, portrayed by Chris Browning. First appearing in the series' third episode "Fight or Flight", this version is a former reactor engineer named Ben Krull who became Reactron when he was exposed to radiation after a terrorist attack which was stopped by Superman. Ben survived the radiation, but his wife Alyssa did not. Ben blames Superman for his wife's death and swore vengeance on him. He then built an advanced bio-medical exo-suit capable of firing highly concentrated bursts of energy while also giving him super strength and the ability to fly. Cat Grant leaks evidence of Supergirl being Superman's cousin, which causes Reactron to starts targeting Supergirl. He is eventually defeated by Supergirl and arrested.

References

External links
 "Pre-Crisis Reactron" DC Comics Database
 "Post-Crisis Reactron" DC Comics Database

Characters created by Carmine Infantino
Comics characters introduced in 1983
Characters created by Paul Kupperberg
DC Comics characters with superhuman strength
DC Comics metahumans
DC Comics supervillains
Fictional characters with energy-manipulation abilities
Fictional characters with nuclear or radiation abilities
Fictional military sergeants
Fictional United States Army personnel
Fictional Vietnam War veterans